WMSU (92.1 FM) is a radio station licensed to Starkville, Mississippi, United States, with a rhythmic contemporary format. The station is owned by URBan Radio Broadcasting, through licensee GTR Licenses, LLC, and serves the Starkville, West Point and Columbus area. Although they are listed in Arbitron as Rhythmic, its music is mostly hit-driven Hip-Hop but does target a broad multicultural audience.

External links
www.power92jamz.net

MSU
Rhythmic contemporary radio stations in the United States
Radio stations established in 1981
Urban Radio Broadcasting radio stations